Altınova is a town and district of Yalova Province in the east of Marmara region of Turkey. The mayor is Metin Oral (AK Party).

Shipyards area
The increasing demand for new construction, maintenance and repair in the maritime sector resulted in such a level of orders that could not be met. The establishment of a new center of shipbuilding in Yalova Province became inevitable. The main factor in selecting Yalova for the new shipyard area was iys proximity to industrial areas and its location on the transit route of metropolitan cities such as Istanbul, Bursa and Kocaeli. From 2007 on, more and more shipyards were established at the coast of Altınova. As of 2020s, there are over 30 shipyards. The Altinova Shipyard Area was realized as a project by the private sector without any governmental contribution other than the allocation of space. A joint stock company founded in 2004 by more than 40 entrepreneurs in the shipbuilding business was essential in the planning, implementing and coordinating the investments.

References

External links
 District governor's official website 

Towns in Turkey
Populated places in Yalova Province